Ascott-under-Wychwood railway station is a railway station serving the village of Ascott-under-Wychwood in Oxfordshire, England. It is on the Cotswold Line. The station, and all trains serving it, are operated by Great Western Railway.

West of the station is a level crossing, controlled by Ascott-under-Wychwood Signal Box, which also oversees the adjacent end of the double-tracked section of the Cotswold Line. Under proposals to extend the doubling of the route, the signal box was to be removed but budgetary constraints on resignalling led to that proposal being revised.

History
Opened by the Oxford, Worcester and Wolverhampton Railway, it became part of the West Midland Railway and then was absorbed by the Great Western Railway. The station then passed on to the Western Region of British Railways on nationalisation in 1948.

The Reshaping of British Railways report proposed the closure of Ascott-under-Wychwood station, but the recommendation was not implemented.

When British Rail introduced Sectorisation in the 1980s, the station was served by Network SouthEast until the Privatisation of British Rail. It was then managed by Thames Trains, but after a short period with First Great Western Link, it is now managed by Great Western Railway.

Services
Currently there is only one peak-hour train per day in each direction Mondays–Fridays including most bank holidays, and no regular Saturday or Sunday service. A limited Saturday service operates in the weeks running up to Christmas.

References

External links

Station on navigable O.S. map

Railway stations in Oxfordshire
DfT Category F2 stations
Former Great Western Railway stations
Railway stations in Great Britain opened in 1853
Railway stations served by Great Western Railway